John Manning (died 1868) was a New Zealand journalist, Irish nationalist, newspaper proprietor and newspaper editor. He was born in Ireland.

References

New Zealand journalists
Irish emigrants to New Zealand (before 1923)
1868 deaths
Year of birth unknown